Crataegus uniflora is a species of hawthorn known by the common name one-flowered hawthorn, or dwarf hawthorn. It is native to parts of the southeastern United States. The plant is usually a small bush, but some forms can be a few meters tall. The flowers occur singly or in small clusters. The fruit are hairy and yellow to reddish in colour.

References

External links
  "One-flower Hawthorn, Crataegus uniflora Muen."  (Georgia, Southeastern United States) 

uniflora
Trees of the Southeastern United States
Flora of North America